Edmund Gilling Hallewell (born 1796) was an Irish Conservative Party Member of the Parliament of the United Kingdom who represented the constituency of Newry from 1851 to 1852.

Hallewell was the son of Reverend John Hallewell of Farnham in Yorkshire. His mother Ellen was a daughter of Edmund Gilling of Marton-le-Moor, Yorkshire. He was educated at Ripon Grammar School.

In 1821 he married Matha Watts, only daughter and heir of Joseph Watts of Stratford House, Stroud, Gloucestershire. In 1855 he married Anne Winthrop, the third daughter of Admiral Winthrop. His son Lieutenant-Colonel Edmund Hallewell (1822–1869) married Sophia Reid, the daughter of General Sir William Reid.

References

External links 
 

1796 births
Year of death missing
People from the Borough of Harrogate
People educated at Ripon Grammar School
Irish Conservative Party MPs
Members of the Parliament of the United Kingdom for Newry (1801–1918)
UK MPs 1847–1852